BCL2/adenovirus E1B 19 kDa protein-interacting protein 3 is a protein that in humans is encoded by the BNIP3 gene.

BNIP3 is a member of the apoptotic Bcl-2 protein family. It can induce cell death while also assisting with cell survival. Like many of the Bcl-2 family proteins, BNIP3 modulates the permeability state of the outer mitochondrial membrane by forming homo- and hetero-oligomers inside the membrane. Upregulation results in a decrease in mitochondrial potential, an increase in reactive oxygen species, mitochondrial swelling and fission, and an increase in mitochondrial turnover via autophagy. Sequence similarity with Bcl-2 family members was not detected. Humans and other animals (Drosophila, Caenorhabditis), as well as lower eukaryotes (Dictyostelium, Trypanosoma, Cryptosporidium, Paramecium) encode several BNIP3 paralogues including the human NIP3L, which induces apoptosis by interacting with viral and cellular anti-apoptosis proteins.

Structure 
The right-handed parallel helix-helix structure of the domain with a hydrogen bond-rich His-Ser node in the middle of the membrane, accessibility of the node for water, and continuous hydrophilic track across the membrane suggest that the domain can provide an ion-conducting pathway through the membrane. Incorporation of the BNIP3 transmembrane domain into an artificial lipid bilayer resulted in a pH-dependent conductivity increase. Necrosis-like cell death induced by BNIP3 may be related to this activity.

Function 
BNIP3 interacts with the E1B 19 kDa protein which is responsible for the protection of virally induced cell death, as well as E1B 19 kDa-like sequences of BCL2, also an apoptotic protector. This gene contains a BH3 domain and a transmembrane domain, which have been associated with pro-apoptotic function.  The dimeric mitochondrial protein encoded by this gene is known to induce apoptosis, even in the presence of BCL2. Change of BNIP3 expression along other members of the Bcl-2 family measured by qPCR captures important characteristics of malignant transformation, and are defined as markers of resistance toward cell death, a key hallmark of cancer.

Transport reaction 
The reaction catalyzed by BNIP3 is:
small molecules (out) ⇌ small molecules (in)

Autophagy 
Autophagy is important for recycling cellular contents and prolonging cell life. Hanna et al. show that BNIP3 and LC3 interact to remove endoplasmic reticulum and mitochondria. When inactive BNIP3 is activated on the membrane of the mitochondria, they form homodimers where LC3 can bind to the LC3-interacting region (LIR) motif on BNIP3 and facilitates the formation of an autophagosome. Interestingly, when disrupting BNIP3 and LC3 interaction, researchers found that autophagy was reduced but not completely erased. This suggests that BNIP3 is not the only receptor on the mitochondria and ER to promote autophagy.

This relationship between autophagy and BNIP3 is widely supported in many studies. In ceramide- and arsenic trioxide- treated malignant glioma cells, increased BNIP3 expression led to mitochondrial depolarization and autophagy.

Autophagic cell death 
Increased expression of BNIP3 has been shown to induce cell death in different ways in multiple cell lines. BNIP3 can induce classical apoptosis through cytochrome c and caspase activation in some cells, while in others, cells have undergone autophagic cell death, occurring in the absence of apaf-1, caspase-1 or caspase 3, and without cytochrome c release.

However, it still remains unclear if cell death is from excess autophagy itself or another mechanism. Cell death through excessive autophagy has only been shown experimentally and not in mammalian in vivo models. Kroemer and Levine believe that this name is a misnomer because cell death usually occurs with autophagy rather than by autophagy.

NK cell memory formation 
The innate immune system is generally not known to exhibit memory traits, but emerging research has proven otherwise. In 2017, O’Sullivan et al. found that BNIP3 and BNIP3L play a necessary role in promoting NK cell memory formation. Expression of BNIP3 in NK cells is lowered upon viral infection as NK cell proliferation occurs but returns to its basal amounts by day 14 and through the contraction phase. By using BNIP3-knockout mice, they found a significant decrease in surviving NK cells suggesting they are important to maintain survival of NK memory cells. Additionally, by tracking mitochondria amounts and quality, they found that BNIP3 is necessary for clearing dysfunctional mitochondria with low membrane potential and reducing the build up of ROS to promote cell survival. BNIP3L was also tested and was found to play a nonredundant role in cell survival.

Activities in the mitochondrial membrane

Integration 
Various stimuli like decreased intracellular pH, increased cytosolic calcium concentrations, and other toxic stimuli can induce BNIP3 integration into the outer mitochondrial membrane (OMM). When integrated, its N-terminus remains in the cytoplasm while it stays anchored to the OMM via its C-terminal transmembrane domain (TMD). The TMD is essential for targeting BNIP3 to the mitochondria, homodimerization, and pro-apoptotic function. Its deletion results in the inability to induce autophagy.  Once integrated in the OMM, BNIP3 exists as an inactive monomer until activated.

Activation 
Upon activation, BNIP3 can form heterodimers with BCL2 and BCL-XL and bind to itself. Various conditions have been shown to induce activation and upregulation. Hypoxia has been shown to induce transcriptional upregulation of BNIP3 through an HIF1-dependent pathway in a p53-independent manner in HeLa cells, human skeletal muscle cells, and adult rat cardiomyocytes.

Using BNIP3 phosphomimetics in HEK 293 cells, researchers found that phosphorylation of BNIP3's C-terminus is necessary to prevent mitochondrial damage and promote cell survival by allowing a significant amount of autophagy to occur without the induction of cell death. Factors like cAMP and cGMP levels, calcium availability and growth factors like IGF and EGF can affect this kinase activity.

Interactions 
BNIP3 has been shown to interact with CD47, BCL2-like 1 and Bcl-2.

References

Further reading

External links 
 

Protein families
Membrane proteins
Transmembrane proteins
Transmembrane transporters
Transport proteins
Integral membrane proteins